Calinga is a mountain in the Andes of Argentina. It has a height of 6028 metres.

See also
List of mountains in the Andes

Mountains of Argentina